The men's team pursuit at the 1928 Summer Olympics took place at the Olympic Stadium in Amsterdam.

This track cycling event consisted of multiple rounds. Cyclists competed in teams of four. The event was a single elimination tournament, with a third-place race between the semifinal losers.

Team rosters
Source:

August Meuleman
Yves Van Massenhove
Albert Muylle
Jean Van Buggenhout

Lew Elder
James Davies
Andy Houting
William Peden

Jorge Gamboa
Alejandro Vidal
Carlos Rocuant
Edmond Maillard

Aimé Trantoul
Octave Dayen
René Brossy
André Trantoul

Josef Steger
Anton Joksch
Kurt Einsiedel
Hans Dormbach

Harry Wyld
Lew Wyld
Percy Wyld
George Southall

Cesare Facciani
Giacomo Gaioni
Luigi Tasselli
Mario Lusiani

Roberts Ozols
Zenons Popovs
Ernests Mālers
Fridrihs Ukstiņš

Jan Maas
Jan Pijnenburg
Janus Braspennincx
Piet van der Horst

Józef Lange
Alfred Reul
Jan Zybert
Józef Oksiutycz

Erich Fäs
Gustave Moos
Heinz Gilgen
Joseph Fischler

Galip Cav
Yunus Nüzhet Unat
Cavit Cav
Tacettin Öztürkmen

Match round
Source:

Round 1

Match 1

Match 2

Match 3

Match 4

Match 5

Match 6

Round 2

Match 1

Match 2

Match 3

Match 4

Semifinals

Semifinal 1

Semifinal 2

Medal matches

Gold medal match

Bronze medal match

References

External links
 Cycling at the 1928 Amsterdam Summer Games: Men's Team Pursuit, 4,000 metres

Track cycling at the 1928 Summer Olympics
Cycling at the Summer Olympics – Men's team pursuit